Jack J. Himelblau is an author and a professor of Spanish literature at The University of Texas at San Antonio.  He received his doctorate in 1965  from the University of Michigan with a thesis on "The aesthetic ideas of Alejandro O. Deustua".

Works

Himelblau served on the advisory board for The Paisano, the independent student newspaper of UTSA.

References

Year of birth missing (living people)
Living people
University of Texas at San Antonio faculty
University of Michigan alumni